A breastaurant is a restaurant that requires female waiting staff to be skimpily-dressed. The term dates from the early 1990s, after restaurant chain Hooters opened in the United States. The format has since been adopted by other restaurants, including Redneck Heaven, Tilted Kilt Pub & Eatery, Twin Peaks, Ojos Locos, Bikinis Sports Bar & Grill, and The WingHouse Bar & Grill.

These restaurants often use a sexual double-entendre brand name and may also have appropriate themes, both in decoration and menu. The restaurants may offer perks for customers, such as alcoholic drinks and flirty servers.

History

Hooters is credited as the first breastaurant, having operated since 1983. Other companies soon adopted the format. According to food industry research firm Technomic,  the top three breastaurant chains in the United States after Hooters each had sales growth of 30% or more in 2011.

In October 2012, Bikinis Sports Bar & Grill successfully registered the term "breastaurant" as a trademark with the United States Patent and Trademark Office; but as of May 24, 2019, the trademark lapsed under section 8, "Continued use not filed within Grace Period". Bikinis Sports Bar & Grill had closed its last restaurant on December 23, 2018.

Male variations
Restaurants staffed by males, with a similar focus on server appearance, include Tallywackers, featuring scantily clad men, which opened in Dallas, Texas, in May 2015 and closed in August 2016. In Japan, there are establishments such as Macho Cafe and Macho Meat Shop, where brawny men serve food and drinks.

Starting in 2020, edits of the Hooters sign, now reading “Femboy Hooters,” began trending online, spawning art, more edits and cosplay.

Criticism
Breastaurants have been criticized for objectifying women.

See also
Bikini barista
Butler café
Café con piernas
Cosplay restaurant
Heart Attack Grill
Hooters Air
Hooters Casino
Host and hostess clubs
Maid café
Nyotaimori
Playboy Club
Sip 'n Dip Lounge
Wet T-shirt contest

References

Erotica
Restaurants by type
Sexualization